Franke Sloothaak (born 2 February 1958 in Heerenveen, the Netherlands) is a German show jumping champion, Olympic champion from 1988 and 1996.

Olympic Record
Sloothaak competed for West Germany at the 1984 Summer Olympics in Los Angeles, where he received a bronze medal in team jumping with Farmer, and at the 1988 Summer Olympics in Seoul, where the team received a gold medal.

He participated for Germany at the 1996 Summer Olympics in Atlanta, where he won a gold medal in Team Jumping, together with Lars Nieberg, Ulrich Kirchhoff and Ludger Beerbaum.

Sloothaak still holds the world record for the indoor Puissance. In June 1991, Sloothaak jumped a record-breaking 2.40 m (7 ft 10 in) in Chaudfontaine, Belgium on the horse Optiebeurs Golo.

References

1958 births
Living people
Olympic gold medalists for Germany
Olympic gold medalists for West Germany
Olympic bronze medalists for West Germany
Equestrians at the 1984 Summer Olympics
Equestrians at the 1988 Summer Olympics
Equestrians at the 1992 Summer Olympics
Equestrians at the 1996 Summer Olympics
Olympic equestrians of West Germany
Olympic equestrians of Germany
German male equestrians
Dutch emigrants to Germany
Sportspeople from Heerenveen
Olympic medalists in equestrian
Medalists at the 1996 Summer Olympics
Medalists at the 1988 Summer Olympics
Medalists at the 1984 Summer Olympics